Ludwigsfelde-Struveshof station is a railway station in the municipality of Ludwigsfelde in the Teltow-Fläming district of Brandenburg, Germany. It is served by the line RB 22.

References

Railway stations in Brandenburg
Railway stations in Germany opened in 2012
Buildings and structures in Teltow-Fläming